St Sampson's Church is the name of:

 Saint Sampson's Cathedral in St Petersburg
 St Sampson's Church, Cricklade in Wiltshire
 St Sampson's Church, Golant in Cornwall
 St Sampson's Church, York in North Yorkshire